Eberhard H. Gothein (29 October 1853 in Neumarkt – 13 November 1923 in Berlin) was a German economist and historian. Gothein was a professor at University of Karlsruhe (1885), University of Bonn (1890), and Heidelberg University (1904). He was a representative of the liberal-positivist opposition against the Prussian historical school of Treitschke and Sybel, which was prevalent in Germany. Gothein was the author of valuable works on cultural and economic history, primarily of the 15th to 17th centuries. Furthermore, he was one of the founding fathers of the University of Mannheim's predecessor, the Handelshochschule Mannheim.

Early life
On 29 October 1853, Gothein was born in Neumarkt, Silesia, Prussia.

Education 
Gothein studied history, arts and economics at the University of Wrocław and the Heidelberg University until 1877, when he obtained his Ph.D. Gothein finished his habilitation in 1878 in Wrocław.

Live

Later, Gothein, together with Mannheim's senior mayor Otto Beck, initiated the foundation of the Handelshochschule Mannheim to revive academic education in Mannheim.

Publications
 Der gemeine Pfennig auf dem Reichstage von Worms. Dissertation. Breslau 1877.
 Politische und religiöse Volksbewegungen vor der Reformation. Breslau 1878 
 Die Aufgaben der Kulturgeschichte. Veit & Comp, Leipzig 1889.
 Wirtschaftsgeschichte des Schwarzwaldes und der angrenzenden Landschaften. Trübner, Strasbourg 1892.
 Die badischen Markgrafschaften im 16. Jahrhundert. Winter, Heidelberg 1910.
 Die Renaissance in Süditalien. Duncker & Humblot, Munich 1924.

Literature
 
 Andreas Cser: Eberhard Gothein (1853-1923). Max Webers Nachfolger auf dem Heidelberger Lehrstuhl [für Nationalökonomie]. Aspekte seiner Wissenschaftsbiographie. In: Heidelberg. Jahrbuch zur Geschichte der Stadt 11, 2006/07, S. 57-82. 
 Marie Luise Gothein: Eberhard Gothein. Ein Lebensbild. Seinen Briefen nacherzählt. Kohlhammer, Stuttgart 1931.
 Michael Maurer: Eberhard Gothein (1853-1923). Leben und Werk zwischen Kulturgeschichte und Nationalökonomie. Böhlau, Köln u.a. 2007, 
 Michael Maurer, Johanna Sänger und Editha Ulrich (Hrsg.): „Im Schaffen geniessen.“ Der Briefwechsel der Kulturwissenschaftler Eberhard und Maria Luise Gothein (1883-1923). Böhlau, Köln u.a. 2006, 
 Dagmar Drüll: Heidelberger Gelehrtenlexikon 1803-1932. ( Hrsg.): Rektorat der Ruprecht-Karls-Universität-Heidelberg. Springer Berlin Heidelberg Tokio. 2012. 324 S.

See also
 List of University of Mannheim people

References

External links
 Mannheim's official Website

1853 births
1923 deaths
German political writers
German male non-fiction writers